Musawengosi Mguni (born 8 April 1983 in Harare) is a Zimbabwean football player who plays for Chalkanoras Idaliou.

Career

Club
In June 2008, Mguni moved to Al Shabab, for a reported fee of €1.5 million. One year later Mguni signed for Metalurh Donetsk.

In February 2011, Mguni signed with Russian side Terek Grozny.
After being released by Terek, Mguni re-signed for Metalurh Donetsk in the summer of 2013, before being released by the club, having played only one game, in January 2014.

Career statistics

Club

International

Statistics accurate as of match played 29 February 2024

References

External links
 
 
 

1983 births
Living people
Zimbabwean footballers
Zimbabwe international footballers
Zimbabwean expatriate footballers
Expatriate footballers in Cyprus
Expatriate footballers in Ukraine
Expatriate footballers in Russia
Ukrainian Premier League players
Russian Premier League players
Cypriot First Division players
Cypriot Second Division players
FC Metalurh Donetsk players
FC Akhmat Grozny players
AC Omonia players
Al Shabab Al Arabi Club Dubai players
Motor Action F.C. players
Ayia Napa FC players
Omonia Aradippou players
Karmiotissa FC players
Chalkanoras Idaliou players
Sportspeople from Bulawayo
UAE Pro League players
Association football forwards